Brown, Marshalls and Co. Ltd. was a company that built railway carriages, based in Saltley, Birmingham, England. 

It was formed in 1840. In 1866 it built the original batch of four-wheel coaches for the Talyllyn Railway, which are still in operational use, and in 1873 built two bogie coaches for the Ffestiniog Railway. These were the first iron-framed bogie coaches in Great Britain. These are also still in regular use.

In 1902 it became part of the Metropolitan Amalgamated Railway Carriage & Wagon Company, which eventually formed part of Metro-Cammell - a company that continued to build rolling stock in Birmingham until 2005.

References

Rolling stock manufacturers of the United Kingdom
Manufacturing companies established in 1840
Manufacturing companies disestablished in 1902
1840 establishments in England
1902 disestablishments in England
British companies disestablished in 1902
British companies established in 1840